Lamia Joreige (born in Beirut, Lebanon) is a Lebanese visual artist and filmmaker. She received a BFA (Painting, Filmmaking) from Rhode Island School of Design, Providence, Rhode Island. Since the late 1990s, her works have been widely displayed. She is a co founder and co director (with Sandra Dagher) of the Beirut Art Center.
In 2011, Sandra Dagher and Lamia Joreige organized “Museum as Hub: Beirut Art Center” at New York City's New Museum.

Work

Lamia Joreige works with various media including painting, writing, photography, video and installation. She explores the archive and other subjects related to memory.

Objects of War, a series of testimonials on the Lebanese War  was acquired by the Tate Modern in 2011, being the first major piece of a Lebanese artist on display in this museum’s permanent collections. Her video Beirut, Autopsy of a City is part of Story Board, a digital hub produced by the San Francisco Museum of Modern Art.

Publications

 Works 1994–2017, Lamia Joreige (Kaph Books, 2018) 
Time and the other (Alarm Editions, 2004)
Ici et peut-être ailleurs / Hier, und vielleicht anderswo (Haus der Kulturen der Welt, 2003)

Selected exhibitions

Solo exhibitions
Under-Writing Beirut, Marfa Projects, Beirut, 2017 
After the River, Radcliffe Institute for Advanced Study at Harvard University, 2017
Records for uncertain Times, Art Factum Gallery, Beirut, 2013
A Strange Feeling of Familiarity, Galerie Tanit, Munich, 2009
 Strange Feeling of Familiarity, Naila Kettaneh Kunigk, Beirut, 2008
Time and the Other, Alexandria Contemporary Art Forum, 2006
Time and the Other, Townhouse Gallery, Cairo, 2005
Time and the Other, Galerie Janine Rubeiz, Beirut, 2004
Ici et peut-être ailleurs, Musée Nicéphore Niepce, Chalon-sur-Saône, 2004
Le Déplacement, Galerie Janine Rubeiz, Beirut, 2001
Objets de Guerre & Le Déplacement, Nikki D. Marquardt Gallery, Paris, 2000
Paintings, Galerie Janine Rubeiz, Beirut, 1999
Surfaces, French Cultural Center, Beirut, 1997

Group exhibitions
Cycles Of Collapsing Progress, curated by Karina El Helou and Anissa Touati, Rashid Karami International Fair, Tripoli, Lebanon
 Across Boundaries. Focus on Lebanese Photography, curated by Tarek Nahas, Beirut Art Fair 2018
 On the Edgware Road, Serpentine Gallery, London, 2012
 Beirut, Kunsthalle Wien, Vienna, 2011
 All That Fits: The Aesthetics of Journalism, Quad, Derby, 2011
 Told Untold Retold, Mathaf Arab Museum of Modern Art, Doha, 2010
 All about Beirut, Kunsthalle White Box, Munich, 2010
 The Storyteller (Touring exhibition), Museo Nacional Centro de Arte Reina Sofia, Madrid, 2010
 The Storyteller (Touring exhibition), Art Gallery of Ontario, Toronto, 2010
 Bless my homeland forever, Kunsthalle, Exnergasse, 2010
 Usages du document, Centre Culturel Suisse, Paris, 2009
 Provisions for the Future: Past of the Coming Days, Sharjah Biennial 09, Sharjah, 2009
 Zones of Conflict, Pratt Manhattan Gallery, New York, 2009
 Lebanon Now, Darat al Funun, Amman, 2008
 Foreword, Pavilion of Lebanon, 52nd Venice Biennale, 2007
 Coding Decoding, Museum of Contemporary Art, Roskilde, 2006
 Rumour as Media, Akbank Sanat, Istanbul, 2006
 Out of Beirut, Modern Art Oxford, Oxford, 2006
 Consumption of Justice, Dyarbakir Art Center, Dyarbakir, 2005
 Presence Absence, Tanit Gallery, Munich, 2004
 DisORIENTation, Haus der Kulturen der Welt, Berlin, 2003
 Bater Dance Project (with Zeid Hamdane), Hamdane House, Bater, 2002
 Missing Links, Townhouse Gallery, Cairo, 2001
 Hamra Street Project, Cinema Colisée, Beirut, 2000

References

External links
 Website of Lamia Joreige
 Website of Beirut Art Center

Lebanese painters
Lebanese photographers
Lebanese women photographers
Lebanese women painters
Artists from Beirut
1972 births
Living people
Lebanese contemporary artists
Rhode Island School of Design alumni